The 2013 London Sevens was the seventh edition of the rugby union tournament and the final stage of the 2012–13 IRB Sevens World Series and was hosted at Twickenham Stadium in London, England.

Format
The teams were divided into pools of four teams, who played a round-robin within the pool. Points were awarded in each pool on the standard schedule for rugby sevens tournaments (though different from the standard in the 15-man game)—3 for a win, 2 for a draw, 1 for a loss.

From the end of the 2012/13 Series, promotion and relegation from core team status came into effect, with a pre-qualifying competition in Hong Kong and a final core team qualifier in London at the ninth and final round of the season.

The 2013 London Sevens, the final round of the Series, featured two distinct tournaments, and a total of 20 teams. In the first, the top 12-ranked sides in the HSBC Sevens World Series standings after round eight in Glasgow competed for the London title, and final World Series points towards their overall tally.

In the second, the 13th, 14th and 15th-ranked core teams after the Glasgow event competed against five pre-qualified regional teams from Hong Kong, for the three available core team places on the 2013–14 IRB Sevens World Series.

Teams

Main draw

World Series qualifiers

Main draw
The draw was made on 5 May 2013.

Pool Stage

Pool A

Pool B

Pool C

Knockout stage

Bowl

Plate

Cup

World Series qualifiers
The draw was made on 5 May 2013.

Pool Stage

Pool A

Pool B

Knockout stage
The winners of the Semifinals, Spain and Scotland, earned core status for the 2013–14 IRB Sevens World Series. The losing teams, Portugal and Russia, advanced to the Qualifier Third Place playoff. Portugal won the Qualifier Third Place playoff and therefore became the final team to earn core status next season.

References

External links

London Sevens
London Sevens
2013
London Sevens
London Sevens